Yue or Yueh may refer to:

Places 
 Guangdong, abbreviated , a province of China
 Yue Nan, the Chinese name for Vietnam
 Zhejiang, commonly abbreviated , a province of China

Languages 
 Yue Chinese, a branch of Chinese, spoken primarily in and around Guangdong and Guangxi
 Cantonese, a dialect of Yue Chinese, widely spoken in Guangzhou, Hong Kong and Macau
 Old Yue language, an extinct language or languages spoken by the Baiyue people of southern China

People 
 Yue, a Chinese surname derived from Mandarin ( or ) or Cantonese
 Yue Fei, Song dynasty general
 Shawn Yue, Hong Kong actor and singer
 Yue, a Chinese given name derived from Mandarin (e.g.

Fictional characters 
 Yue (Cardcaptor Sakura), a character in the anime and manga séries Cardcaptor Sakura
 Yue Ayase, a character from the anime and manga series Negima
 Yue Kato, a character in the manga series Angel Sanctuary
 Princess Yue, a character in the television series Avatar: The Last Airbender
 Wellington Yueh, a character from Frank Herbert's Dune universe

Historical peoples 
 Baiyue, a collection of ancient peoples in coastal southern China
 Shanyue, a tribe residing in the Yue area during the Han Dynasty

Historical states 
 Yue (state), a state in modern eastern China during the Spring and Autumn Period
 Minyue, an ancient kingdom located at modern Fujian
 Nanyue, an ancient kingdom consisting of modern Guangdong, Guangxi, Yunnan, and northern Vietnam
 Wuyue, a state in modern Zhejiang during the Five Dynasties and Ten Kingdoms Period

Arts and sciences 
 Yue, an ancient Chinese unit of volume
 Yue, an ancient Chinese wind instrument
 Yueqin, a traditional Chinese string instrument
 Yue ware, early Chinese celadon pottery

See also 
 Yueju (disambiguation)
 Yuezhou (disambiguation)